Sinclair McEvenue, known as "Sinc", was a Canadian football coach who was the head coach of Toronto Argonauts in 1919 and 1921. He was the head coach of the Argonaut team that won the 1921 Grey Cup.

References

Sportspeople from Ontario
Toronto Argonauts coaches
Year of birth missing
Year of death missing